The following is a list of elections that occurred in the year 1959.

Africa
 1959 Mauritanian parliamentary election
 1959 Nigerian parliamentary election
 1959 Senegalese parliamentary election
 1959 Upper Volta Territorial Assembly election

Asia
 1959 South Vietnamese legislative election
 1959 Israeli legislative election
 1959 Malayan general election
 1959 Singaporean general election
 1959 Soviet Union regional elections

Australia
 1959 New South Wales state election
 1959 South Australian state election
 1959 Tasmanian state election
 1959 Western Australian state election

Europe
 1959 Fianna Fáil leadership election
 1959 French municipal elections
 1959 Gibraltar general election
 1959 Irish presidential election
 1959 Soviet Union regional elections

Austria
 1959 Austrian legislative election

France
 1959 French municipal elections

Germany
 1959 Rhineland-Palatinate state election

United Kingdom
 1959 United Kingdom general election
 List of MPs elected in the 1959 United Kingdom general election
 1959 South West Norfolk by-election
 1959 Penistone by-election
 1959 Whitehaven by-election

United Kingdom local

English local
 1959 Bermondsey Borough election
 1959 Southwark Borough election

North America

Canada
 1959 Alberta general election
 1959 Edmonton municipal election
 1959 Manitoba general election
 1959 Newfoundland general election
 1959 Ontario general election
 1959 Prince Edward Island general election

United States
 1959–60 Louisiana gubernatorial election
 1959 Pittsburgh mayoral special election

Oceania

Australia
 1959 New South Wales state election
 1959 South Australian state election
 1959 Tasmanian state election
 1959 Western Australian state election

Other
 1959 Central African Republic parliamentary election
 1959 Chadian parliamentary election
 1959 Dahomeyan legislative election
 1959 Dutch general election
 1959 French Sudan parliamentary election
 1959 Guatemalan parliamentary election
 June 1959 Icelandic parliamentary election
 October 1959 Icelandic parliamentary election
 1959 Italian Somaliland parliamentary election
 1959 Liberian general election
 1959 Luxembourgian legislative election
 1959 Mauritian general election
 1959 Moyen-Congo parliamentary election
 1959 Norwegian local elections
 1959 Philippine Senate election
 1958–1959 Tanganyikan general election

 
1959
Elections